Wang Guofa may refer to:
 Wang Guofa (politician)
 Wang Guofa (engineer)